An insurgency began in Iraq after the 2003 U.S.-led invasion, and lasted throughout the ensuing Iraq War which lasted from 2003 until 2011.
The first phase of the insurgency began shortly after the 2003 invasion and before the establishment of the new Iraqi government. From around 2004 to May 2007, Iraqi insurgents primarily targeted the American-led coalition forces, and later also targeted Iraqi security forces.

With the full-scale eruption of the sectarian civil war in February 2006, many militant attacks in American-controlled central Iraq were directed at the Iraqi police and military forces of the Iraqi government. The attacks continued during the transitional reconstruction of Iraq, as the Iraqi government tried to establish itself. Civil war and sectarian violence ended in mid-2008 and the insurgency continued through the American withdrawal from Iraq in 2011. After the withdrawal in December 2011, a renewed wave of sectarian and anti-government insurgency swept Iraq, causing thousands of casualties in 2012. Increasing violence in 2013 led to the War in Iraq (2013–2017).

The insurgents in Iraq have been composed of a diverse mix of militias, foreign fighters, all-Iraqi units or mixtures opposing the American-led Multi-National Force – Iraq and the post-2003 Iraqi government. During the height of the Iraq War in 2006 to 2008, the fighting involved both armed conflict against the American-led military coalition, as well as sectarian violence among the different ethnic groups. The insurgents were involved in asymmetric warfare and a war of attrition against the American-supported Iraqi government and American forces in central Iraq, while conducting coercive tactics against rivals or other militias. Iraq's deep sectarian divides had been a major dynamic in the insurgency, with support for the insurgents varying among different segments of the population.

Background 

The 2003 invasion of Iraq (19 March – 1 May 2003) began the Iraq War, or Operation Iraqi Freedom, in which a combined force of troops from the United States, the United Kingdom, Australia, and Poland invaded Iraq and toppled the government of Saddam Hussein within 21 days of major combat operations. The invasion phase consisted of a conventionally fought war which concluded with the capture of the Iraq capital Baghdad by U.S. forces.

Four countries participated with troops during the initial invasion phase, which lasted from 19 March to 9 April 2003. These were the United States (148,000), United Kingdom (45,000), Australia (2,000), and Poland (194). Thirty-six other countries were involved in its aftermath. In preparation for the invasion, 100,000 U.S. troops were assembled in Kuwait by 18 February. The United States supplied the majority of the invading forces, but also received support from Kurdish irregulars in Iraqi Kurdistan.

The invasion was preceded by an air strike on the Presidential Palace in Baghdad on 19 March 2003. The following day coalition forces launched an incursion into Basra Province from their massing point close to the Iraqi-Kuwaiti border. While the special forces launched an amphibious assault from the Persian Gulf to secure Basra and the surrounding petroleum fields, the main invasion army moved into southern Iraq, occupying the region and engaging in the Battle of Nasiriyah on 23 March. Massive air strikes across the country and against Iraqi command and control threw the defending army into chaos and prevented an effective resistance. On 26 March the 173rd Airborne Brigade was airdropped near the northern city of Kirkuk where they joined forces with Kurdish rebels and fought several actions against the Iraqi army to secure the northern part of the country.

The main body of coalition forces continued their drive into the heart of Iraq and met with little resistance. Most of the Iraqi military was quickly defeated and Baghdad was occupied on 9 April. Other operations occurred against pockets of the Iraqi army including the capture and occupation of Kirkuk on 10 April, and the attack and capture of Tikrit on 15 April. Iraqi President Saddam Hussein and the central leadership went into hiding as the coalition forces completed the occupation of the country.

On 1 May, an end of major combat operations was declared, ending the invasion stage of the Iraq War and beginning the military occupation period and the Iraqi insurgency against coalition forces.

History

First phase of insurgency (2003–06) 

The Iraqi insurgency of 2003–06 erupted following the invasion of Iraq and the toppling of Saddam Hussein's rule in May 2003. The armed insurgent opposition to the United States-led multinational force in Iraq and the post-2003 Iraqi government lasted until early 2006, when it deteriorated into a sectarian civil war, the most violent phase of the Iraq War.

Sectarian civil war (2006–2008) 

Following the U.S.-launched 2003 invasion of Iraq, the situation deteriorated, and by 2007, the intercommunal violence between Iraqi Sunni and Shi'a factions was described by the National Intelligence Estimate as having elements of a civil war. In a 10 January 2007 address to the American people, President George W. Bush stated that "80% of Iraq's sectarian violence occurs within  of the capital. This violence is splitting Baghdad into sectarian enclaves, and shaking the confidence of all Iraqis." Two polls of Americans conducted in 2006 found that between 65% to 85% believed Iraq was in a civil war; however, a similar poll of Iraqis conducted in 2007 found that 61% did not believe that they were in a civil war.

In October 2006, the Office of the United Nations High Commissioner for Refugees (UNHCR) and the Iraqi government estimated that more than 370,000 Iraqis had been displaced since the 2006 bombing of the al-Askari Mosque, bringing the total number of Iraqi refugees to more than 1.6 million. By 2008, the UNHCR raised the estimate of refugees to a total of about 4.7 million (~16% of the population). The number of refugees estimated abroad was 2 million (a number close to CIA projections) and the number of internally displaced people was 2.7 million. The estimated number of orphans across Iraq has ranged from 400,000 (according to the Baghdad Provincial Council), to five million (according to Iraq's anti-corruption board). A UN report from 2008 placed the number of orphans at about 870,000. The Red Cross has also stated that Iraq's humanitarian situation remains among the most critical in the world, with millions of Iraqis forced to rely on insufficient and poor-quality water sources.

According to the Failed States Index, produced by Foreign Policy magazine and the Fund for Peace, Iraq was one of the world's top 5 unstable states from 2005 to 2008. A poll of top U.S. foreign policy experts conducted in 2007 showed that over the next 10 years, just 3% of experts believed the U.S. would be able to rebuild Iraq into a "beacon of democracy" and 58% of experts believed that Sunni-Shiite tensions would dramatically increase in the Middle East.

In June 2008, the U.S. Department of Defense reported that "the security, political and economic trends in Iraq continue to be positive; however, they remain fragile, reversible and uneven." In July 2008, the audit arm of the U.S. Congress recommended that the U.S. Government should "develop an updated strategy for Iraq that defines U.S. goals and objectives after July 2008 and addresses the long-term goal of achieving an Iraq that can govern, defend, and sustain itself". Steven Simon, a Senior Fellow for Middle Eastern Studies at the Council on Foreign Relations, wrote in May 2008 that "the recent short-term gains" had "come at the expense of the long-term goal of a stable, unitary Iraq."

After Iraqi security forces took the lead in security operations on 30 June 2009, Iraq experienced a "dramatic reduction in war-related violence of all types ..., with civilian and military deaths down by 80 to 90 percent compared with the same period in 2008."

2008–2011 insurgency 

In 2010, the low point for the al-Qaeda effort in Iraq, car bombings declined to an average of ten a month and multiple-location attacks occurred only two or three times a year.

Aftermath

Post-U.S. withdrawal insurgency 

The Iraqi attacks since U.S. withdrawal relates to the last stage of violent terror activities engaged by Iraqi, primarily radical Sunni and Shia insurgent groups against the central government and the sectarian warfare between various factions within Iraq in the aftermath of the U.S. withdrawal. The events of post-U.S. withdrawal violence succeeded the previous insurgency in Iraq (prior to 18 December 2011), but have showed increasingly violent patterns, raising concerns that the surging violence might slide into another civil war.

Conflict parties 
The Iraqi insurgency is composed of at least a dozen major organizations and perhaps as many as 40 distinct groups. These groups are subdivided into countless smaller cells. The Washington-based Centre for Strategic and International Studies (CSIS) estimates that less than 10% of insurgents are non-Iraqi foreign fighters. According to the Chief of the British General Staff, General Sir Richard Dannatt, speaking in September 2007,

Because of its clandestine nature, the exact composition of the Iraqi insurgency is difficult to determine, but the main groupings are:
 Ba'athists, the supporters of Saddam Hussein's former administration including army or intelligence officers, whose ideology is a variant of Pan-Arabism.
 Iraqi nationalists, Iraqis who believe in a strong version of Iraqi self-determination. These policies may not necessarily espouse a Pan-Arab ideology, but rather advocate the country's territorial integrity including Kuwait and Khuzestan. Historical figures of this movement include the pre-Ba'athist leader of Iraq Abd al-Karim Qasim and his government.
 Iraqi Salafi Islamists, the indigenous armed followers of the Salafi movement, as well as any remnants of the Kurdish Ansar al-Islam: individuals with a Salafi-only policy opposed to non-Salafis though not aligned to one specific ethnic group. Though opposed to the U.S.-led invasion, these groups are not wholly sympathetic towards the former Ba'ath Party as its members included non-Salafis.
 Shi'a militias, including the southern, Iran-linked Badr Organization, the Mahdi Army, and the central-Iraq followers of Muqtada al-Sadr. These groups neither advocate the dominance of a single ethnic group, nor the traditional ideologies behind the Iraqi state (e.g. these particular Shi'as do not support the capture of Khuzestan or other border areas with Iran, but rather promote warm relations with Iran's Shi'a government).
 Foreign Islamist volunteers, including those often linked to al Qaeda and largely driven by the Salafi/Wahhabi doctrine (the two preceding categories are often lumped as "jihadists");
 Possibly some socialist revolutionaries (such as the Iraqi Armed Revolutionary Resistance, which claimed one attack in 2007).
 Non-violent resistance groups and political parties (not part of the armed insurgency).

Arab Nationalist

Ba'athists 

The Ba'athists include former Ba'ath Party officials, the Fedayeen Saddam, and some former agents of the Iraqi intelligence elements and security services, such as the Mukhabarat and the Special Security Organization. Their goal, at least before the capture of Saddam Hussein, was the restoration of the former Ba'athist government to power. The pre-war organization of the Ba'ath Party and its militias as a cellular structure aided the continued pro-Saddam resistance after the fall of Baghdad, and Iraqi intelligence operatives may have developed a plan for guerrilla war following the toppling of Saddam Hussein from power.

Following Saddam's capture, the Ba'athist movement largely faded; its surviving factions were increasingly shifting to either nationalist factions (Iraqi, though not Pan-Arab, such as the ideology of the pre-Ba'athist regime), or Islamist (Sunni or Shia, depending on the actual faith of the individual, though Ba'ath Party policy had been secular, and many of its members were atheist).

As the goal of restoring the Ba'ath Party to power was seemingly out of reach, the alternative solution appeared to be to join forces with organisations who opposed the U.S.-led invasion. Many former Ba'athists had adopted an Islamist façade to attract more credibility within the country, and perhaps gain support from outside Iraq. Others, especially following the January 2005 elections, became more interested in politics.

The fall of Baghdad effectively ended the existence of the Fedayeen Saddam as an organized paramilitary. Several of its members died during the war. A large number survived, however, and were willing to carry on the fight even after the fall of Saddam Hussein from power. Many former members joined guerrilla organizations that began to form to resist the U.S-led coalition in Iraq. By June, an insurgency was underway in central and northern Iraq, especially in an area known as the Sunni Triangle. Some units of the Fedayeen also continued to operate independently of other insurgent organizations in the Sunni areas of Iraq. On 30 November 2003, a U.S. convoy traveling through the town of Samarra in the Sunni Triangle was ambushed by over 100 Iraqi guerillas, reportedly wearing trademark Fedayeen Saddam uniforms.

Following the execution of Saddam Hussein, Deputy Leader of the Iraqi-cell of the Iraqi-led Ba'ath Party and former Vice President of Iraq Izzat Ibrahim ad-Douri became a leading candidate to succeed him as Leader of the Iraqi Ba'ath Party. Ad-Douri had taken over the running of the Iraqi Ba'ath Party following Saddam Hussein's capture in 2003 and had been endorsed by a previously unknown group calling itself Baghdad Citizens Gathering. On 3 January 2007 the website of the banned Iraqi Ba'ath Party confirmed that he was new leader of the party.

Increasing Syrian influence in the Iraqi Ba'ath Party may well have a major effect on result in a fragmentation of Ba'athist parts of the insurgency.

Iraqi Nationalists 
Iraqi nationalists are mostly drawn from the Arab regions. Their reasons for opposing the Coalition vary from a rejection of the Coalition presence as a matter of principle to the failure of the multinational forces to fully restore public services and to quickly restore complete sovereignty.

One notable leader of the insurgency among nationalist Sunni is former aide to Saddam Hussein and a former regional Ba'ath Party Organiser Mohammed Younis al-Ahmed al-Muwali who has been crossing the border between Iraq and Syria disbursing funds, smuggling weaponry and organising much of the fighting in the central area of Iraq.

One former minister in the interim government, Ayham al-Samarai, announced the launch in 2005 of "a new political movement, saying he aimed to give a voice to figures from the legitimate Iraqi resistance. 'The birth of this political bloc is to silence the skeptics who say there is no legitimate Iraqi resistance and that they cannot reveal their political face,' he told a news conference." It is unclear what became of this movement.

Sunni Militias 
Examples of Sunni Islamist groups include Mujahideen Shura Council, the Islamic Army in Iraq, al-Qaeda in Iraq, the United Jihad Factions Council and Jaish al-Rashideen. The Army of the Men of the Naqshbandi Order are also a Sunni/Sufi Islamist organisation but are also Iraqi and Arab Nationalist in orientation.

Hard-line clerics and remaining underground cells of the Muslim Brotherhood in Iraq have helped provide support for the indigenous militant Islamist movement. Supportive of this strand is the founder of the ultra-conservative and Wahabbi Association of Muslim Scholars, Sheikh Hareth Al-Dhari.

Shia Militias 
The Shia militias have presented Nouri al-Maliki with perhaps the greatest conundrum of his administration given the capture of Amarah. American officials have pressed him hard to disarm the militias and rid the state security forces of their influence.

A 2008 report by the Combating Terrorism Center at West Point based on reports from the interrogations of dozens of captured Shia fighters described an Iranian-run network smuggling Shia fighters into Iran where they received training and weapons before returning to Iraq.

Badr Organization 
One major Shia militia in Iraq is the Badr Organization, the military wing of the Supreme Islamic Council of Iraq. The group is currently based in Karbala, Iraq, and is also active in areas throughout southern Iraq. The group was formed by the Iranian Government to fight the Saddam Hussein-controlled Iraq during the Iran–Iraq War. Originally, the group consisted of Iraqi exiles who were banished from Iraq during the reign of Saddam Hussein. After the war ended in 1988, the organization remained in Iran until Saddam Hussein was overthrown during the 2003 invasion of Iraq. Following the invasion, the brigade then moved into Iraq, became members of the new Iraq Army, and aided coalition forces in insurgents.

Colonel Derek Harvey told Reuters "that the U.S. military detained Badr assassination teams possessing target lists of Sunni officers and pilots in 2003 and 2004 but did not hold them. Harvey said his superiors told him that 'this stuff had to play itself out' – implying that revenge attacks by returning Shi'ite groups were to be expected. He also said Badr and ISCI offered intelligence and advice to U.S. officials on how to navigate Iraqi politics."

In a letter published by the Coalition in February 2004, an insurgent believed to be Zarqawi wrote that jihadis should start an open sectarian war so that Sunnis would mobilize against what would otherwise be a secret war being waged by Shia. The author only specifically pointed to assassinations carried out by the Badr Brigade as an example of this secret war.

Jerry Burke, an adviser to the Iraqi Interior Ministry, told Musings on Iraq that his plan to surveil and stop suspected Badr Brigade death squads in the special police forces was rejected when it got to an American Flag (General) Officer.

In December 2005, the group and their leaders in the Supreme Islamic Council of Iraq participated in parliament elections, under the pro-Shiite coalition known as the United Iraqi Alliance, and managed to get 36 members into the Iraqi Parliament.

The Badr organization supports the government of Nouri Al-Maliki.

Muqtada al-Sadr 
Supporters of the young Shi'a cleric Muqtada al-Sadr are largely impoverished men from the Shi'a urban areas and slums in Baghdad and the southern Shi'a cities. The Mahdi Army area of operation stretches from Basra in the south to the Sadr City section of Baghdad in central Iraq (some scattered Shi'a militia activity has also been reported in Baquba and Kirkuk, where Shi'a minorities exist).

During his group's active militant phase, Al-Sadr enjoyed wide support from the Iraqi people according to some polls. A poll by the Iraq Center for Research and Studies found that 32% of Iraqis "strongly supported" him and another 36% "somewhat supported" him, making him the second most popular man in Iraq, behind only Ayatollah Ali Al-Sistani. The Mahdi Army is believed to have around 60,000 members.

After the December 2005 elections in Iraq, Al-Sadr's party got 32 new seats giving him substantial political power in the divided Iraqi Parliament. In January 2006, he used these seats to swing the vote for prime minister to Ibrahim Al-Jaafari, giving Al-Sadr a legitimate stake in the new Iraqi government and allying Al-Jaafari with the cleric.

On 27 November 2006, a senior American intelligence official told reporters that the Iranian-backed group Hezbollah had been training members of the Mahdi Army. The official said that 1,000 to 2,000 fighters from the Mahdi Army and other Shia militias had been trained by Hezbollah in Lebanon, and a small number of Hezbollah operatives have also visited Iraq to help with training. Iran has facilitated the link between Hezbollah and the Shia militias in Iraq, the official said. "There seems to have been a strategic decision taken sometime over late winter or early spring by Damascus, Tehran, along with their partners in ait Lebanese Hezbollah, to provide more support to Sadr to increase pressure on the U.S.," the American intelligence official said.

Foreign participants 
When Saddam Hussein was captured in December 2003, several documents were found in his possession. One particular document, which was apparently written after he lost power, appeared to be a directive to his Ba'athist loyalists warning them to be wary of Islamist mujahideen and other foreign Arabs entering the country to join the insurgency. The directive supposedly shows Saddam having concerns that foreign fighters would not share the same objectives as Ba'ath loyalists (i.e. the eventual return of Saddam to power and the restoration of his regime). A U.S. official commenting on the document stressed that while Saddam urged his followers to be cautious in their dealings with other Arab fighters, he did not order them to avoid contact or rule out co-operation. Bruce Hoffman, a Washington counter-terrorism expert stated that the existence of the document underscores the fact that "this is an insurgency cut of many different cloths...[and] everybody's jockeying for their position of power in the future Iraq." Many experts believe that fighters from other countries who have flocked to Iraq to join the insurgents are motivated by animosity toward the United States and the desire to install an Islamic state in place of the Ba'ath Party's secular regime.

Foreign fighters are mostly Arabs from neighboring countries, who have entered Iraq, primarily through the porous desert borders of Syria and Saudi Arabia, to assist the Iraqi insurgency. Many of these fighters are Wahhabi fundamentalists who see Iraq as the new "field of jihad" in the battle against U.S. forces. It is generally believed that most are freelance fighters, but a few members of Al-Qaeda and the related group Ansar al-Islam are suspected of infiltrating into the Sunni areas of Iraq through the mountainous northeastern border with Iran. The United States and its allies point to Jordanian-born Al-Qaeda in Iraq leader Abu Musab al-Zarqawi as the key player in this group. Zarqawi was considered the head of an insurgent group called Al-Tawhid Wal-Jihad ("Monotheism and Holy War") until his death on 7 June 2006, which according to U.S. estimates numbers in the low hundreds.

Usage of the term "foreign fighters" has received criticism as being Western-centric because, taken literally, the term would encompass all non-Iraqi forces, including Coalition forces. Zarqawi has taken to taunting the American forces about the irony of the term: "Who is the foreigner, O cross worshippers? You are the ones who came to the land of the Muslims from your distant corrupt land." (Communiqué of 10 May 2005). Zarqawi's group has since announced the formation of the Ansar platoon, a squad of Iraqi suicide bombers, which an AP writer called "an apparent bid to deflect criticism that most suicide bombers in Iraq are foreigners."

While it is not known how many of those fighting the U.S. forces in Iraq are from outside the country, it is generally agreed that foreign fighters make up a very small percentage of the insurgency. Major General Joseph Taluto, head of the 42nd Infantry Division, said that "99.9 per cent" of captured Insurgents are Iraqi. The estimate has been confirmed by the Pentagon's own figures; in one analysis of over 1000 insurgents captured in Fallujah, only 15 were non-Iraqi. According to the Daily Telegraph, information from military commanders engaging in battles around Ramadi exposed the fact that out of 1300 suspected insurgents arrested in five months of 2005, none were foreign, although Colonel John Gronski stated that foreigners provided money and logistical support: "The foreign fighters are staying north of the [Euphrates] river, training and advising, like the Soviets were doing in Vietnam"

In September 2006, the Christian Science Monitor reported, "It's true that foreign fighters are in Iraq, such as Abu Musab al-Zarqawi. But they are a small minority of the insurgents, say administration critics. Most Iraqi mujahideen are Sunnis who fear their interests will be ignored under Iraq's Shia-dominated government. They are fighting for concrete, local political goals – not the destruction of America." The paper quoted University of Michigan history professor Juan Cole: "If the Iraqi Sunni nationalists could take over their own territory, they would not put up with the few hundred foreign volunteers blowing things up, and would send them away or slit their throats." In 2005, the Washington-based Centre for Strategic and International Studies (CSIS) concluded that foreign fighters accounted for less than 10% of the estimated 30,000 insurgents and argued that the U.S. and Iraqi Governments were "feeding the myth" that they comprised the backbone of the insurgency.

Despite the low numbers of foreign fighters their presence has been confirmed in several ways and Coalition forces believe the majority of suicide bombings are believed to be carried out by non-Iraqi foreigners. Kenneth Katzman, a Middle East expert with the Congressional Research Service, stated in June 2005: "I still think 80 percent of the Insurgents, the day to day activity, is Iraqi – the roadside bombings, mortars, direct weapons fire, rifle fire, automatic weapons fire...[but] the foreign fighters attract the headlines with the suicide bombings, no question."

In September 2005, Iraqi and U.S. forces conducted a counter-insurgency operation in the predominantly Turkmen town of Tal Afar. According to an AP, report, an Iraqi Army Captain claimed that Iraqi forces arrested 150 non-Iraqi Arabs (Syria, Sudan, Yemen and Jordan) in the operation; the American army claimed 20% of arrests were foreign combatants, while Donald Rumsfeld on PBS confirmed that foreign combatants were present. However, not all accounts of the battle mention these arrests, and U.S. Army commander Colonel H. R. McMaster said the "vast majority" of Insurgents captured there were "Iraqis and not foreigners." Iraqi journalist Nasir Ali claimed that there were "very few foreign combatants" in Tal Afar and charged "Every time the US army and the Iraqi government want to destroy a specific city, they claim it hosts Arab fighters and Abu Musab al-Zarqawi."

There are allegations that the U.S. government has attempted to inflate the number of foreign fighters in order to advance the theory that the insurgency is not a local movement. U.S. Army Specialist Tony Lagouranis spoke about his job identifying many of the bodies after the assault on Fallujah:

Foreign fighter nationality distribution 
In July 2007, the Los Angeles Times reported that 45% of all foreign militants targeting U.S. troops and Iraqi civilians and security forces are from Saudi Arabia; 15% are from Syria and Lebanon; and 10% are from North Africa. 50% of all Saudi fighters in Iraq come as suicide bombers. In the six months preceding that article, such bombings have killed or injured 4,000 Iraqis.

According to a U.S. military press briefing on 20 October 2005, 312 foreign nationals from 27 countries had been captured in Iraq from April to October 2005. This represents a component of the Iraqi insurgent movement, which also includes a nationalist movement encompassing over 30 Shia and Sunni militias.

Foreign insurgents captured in Iraq in the 7-month period April–October 2005:

Abu Musab al-Zarqawi 

The extent of Zarqawi's influence is a source of much controversy. Zarqawi was reported killed in action in March 2004 in "a statement signed by a dozen alleged insurgent groups". His Jordanian family then held a funeral service on his behalf, although no body was recovered and positively identified. Iraqi leaders denied the presence of Zarqawi in Fallujah prior to the U.S. attack on that city in November 2004. Zarqawi's existence was even questioned.

Involvement of Zarqawi in significant terrorist incidents was not usually proven, although his group often claimed it perpetrated bombings. As al-Qaeda is an "opt-in" group (meaning everyone who agrees to some basic Wahhabi moral tenets and the fundamental goals may consider himself a member), it is most likely that "Al-Qaeda in Iraq" is a loose association of largely independent cells united by a common strategy and vision, rather than a unified organization with a firm internal structure.

On 8 June 2006, Iraqi officials confirmed Zarqawi was killed by two 500 lb laser-guided bombs dropped from an F-16 the previous evening. Abu Ayyub al-Masri, an Egyptian who was trained in Al-Qaeda camps in Afghanistan took his place.

A document found in Zarqawi's safe house indicates that the guerrilla group was trying to provoke the U.S. to attack Iran in order to reinvigorate the resistance in Iraq and to weaken American forces in Iraq. "The question remains, how to draw the Americans into fighting a war against Iran? It is not known whether American is serious in its animosity towards Iraq, because of the big support Iran is offering to America in its war in Afghanistan and in Iraq. Hence, it is necessary first to exaggerate the Iranian danger and to convince America and the west in general, of the real danger coming from Iran...". The document then outlines 6 ways to incite war between the two nations. Iraqi national security adviser Mowaffak al-Rubaie said the document, shows al-Qaeda in Iraq is in "pretty bad shape." He added that "we believe that this is the beginning of the end of al-Qaeda in Iraq."

Journalist Jill Carroll, detailing her captivity in Iraq, described one of her captors who identified himself as Abdullah Rashid and leader of the Mujahideen Shura Council in Iraq. He told her that; "The Americans were constantly saying that the mujahideen in Iraq were led by foreigners... So, the Iraqi insurgents went to Zarqawi and insisted that an Iraqi be put in charge." She continued by stating; "But as I saw in coming weeks, Zarqawi remained the insurgents' hero, and the most influential member of their council, whatever Nour/Rashid's position... At various times, I heard my captors discussing changes in their plans because of directives from the council and Zarqawi."

Schism between foreign fighters and native insurgency 
Large-scale terrorist attacks against civilians carried out by foreign fighters, as well as the interpretation of Islam that they attempt to impose on the local population in areas under their control, have increasingly turned Iraqis against them, in some cases breaking out into open fighting between different groups in the insurgency. There are signs that local Islamist insurgent groups have also increasingly caused the population to turn against them.

Opinions differ on how broad this schism is. Terrorism expert Jessica Stern warned that; "In the run-up to the war, most Iraqis viewed the foreign volunteers who were rushing in to fight against America as troublemakers, and Saddam Hussein's forces reportedly killed many of them." This opinion contradicts Iraqi scholar Mustapha Alani, who says that these foreigners are increasingly welcomed by the public, especially in the former Ba'athist strongholds north of Baghdad.

While some have noted an alliance of convenience that existed between the foreign fighters and the native Sunni insurgents, there are signs that the foreign militants, especially those who follow Zarqawi, are increasingly unpopular among the native fighters. In the run-up to the December 2005 elections, Sunni fighters were warning al-Qaeda members and foreign fighters not to attack polling stations. One former Ba'athist told Reuters; "Sunnis should vote to make political gains. We have sent leaflets telling al-Qaeda that they will face us if they attack voters." An unnamed Sunni leader was quoted commenting on Zarqawi; "Zarqawi is an American, Israeli and Iranian agent who is trying to keep our country unstable so that the Sunnis will keep facing occupation."

By early 2006, the split between the Sunni groups and the Zarqawi-led foreign fighters had grown dramatically, and Sunni forces began targeting al-Qaeda forces for assassination. One senior intelligence official told the Telegraph that Zarqawi had fled to Iran as a result of the attacks. In response to al-Qaeda killings in Iraq, Sunni insurgents in al-Anbar province led by former Ba'athist intelligence officer Ahmed Ftaikhan formed an anti-al-Qaeda militia called the Anbar Revolutionaries. All of the militia's core members have relatives who have been killed by al-Qaeda in Iraq, and they have sought to prevent foreign jihadis from entering the country. The group "claims to have killed 20 foreign fighters and 33 Iraqi sympathizers." The schism became all the more apparent in when a tape alleged to be from the Mujahedeen Shura Council urged Osama Bin Laden to replace al-Qaeda in Iraq's current head with an Iraqi national. The Mujahedeen Shura Council, however, issued a statement shortly afterwards denying the authenticity of this tape.

On 19 July 2007 seven domestic insurgent groups informed journalists in Damascus that they were forming a united front independent of al-Qaeda.

Iranian influence 
An estimated 150 Iranian intelligence officers, plus members of Iran's Islamic Revolutionary Guard Corps, are believed to be active inside Iraq at any given time. For more than a year, U.S. troops have detained and recorded fingerprints, photographs, and DNA samples from dozens of suspected Iranian agents in a catch and release program designed to intimidate the Iranian leadership. Iranian influence is felt most heavily within the Iraqi Government, the ISF, and Shiite militias.

Interrogation of members from the Asaib Ahl al Haq network revealed that the group had received substantial Iran-based training in explosives technology; arms and munitions; and some cases of advice. All this is alleged by the U.S. military to have taken place through the Quds force of the Islamic Revolutionary Guard Corps. It is also alleged that Iran supports Muqtada al-Sadr's Mahdi Army.

Although the CPA enforced a 1987 law banning unions in public enterprises, trade unions such as the Iraqi Federation of Trade Unions (IFTU) and Iraq's Union of the Unemployed have also mounted effective opposition to the Coalition. However, no trades unions support the armed insurgents, and unions have themselves been subject to attacks from the insurgents. Hadi Saleh of the IFTU was assassinated under circumstances that pointed to a Ba'athist insurgent group on 3 January 2005. Another union federation, the General Union of Oil Employees (GUOE) opposes the Coalition forces in Iraq and calls for immediate withdrawal but was neutral on participation in the election. Whereas the GUOE wants all Coalition troops out immediately, both the IFTU and the Workers Councils' call for replacement of U.S. and British forces with neutral forces from the UN, the Arab League and other nations as a transition.

Tactics 

The tactics of the Iraqi insurgency vary widely. The majority of militant elements use improvised explosive devices (IEDs), car bombs, kidnappings, hostage-taking, shootings, ambushes, sniper attacks, mortar and rocket strikes and other types of attacks to target Iraqis and U.S. forces with little regard for civilian casualties.

Awareness of American public opinion 
A single study has compared the number of insurgent attacks in Iraq to supposedly negative statements in the U.S. media, release of public opinion polls, and geographic variations in access to international media by Iraqis. The purpose was to determine if there was a link between insurgent activity and media reports. The researchers' study suggested it may be possible that insurgent attacks spiked by 5 to 10% after increases in the number of negative reports of the war in the media. The authors believe this may possibly be an "emboldenment effect" and speculated that "insurgent groups respond rationally to expected probability of US withdrawal."

Iraqi public opinion 
A series of several polls have been conducted to ascertain the position of the Iraqi public further on Al Qaeda in Iraq and the U.S. presence. Some polls have found the following:
 Polls suggest the majority of Iraqis disapprove of the presence of Coalition forces.
 A majority of both Sunnis and Shi'as want an end to the U.S. presence as soon as possible, although Sunnis are opposed to the Coalition soldiers being there by greater margins.
 Polls suggest the vast majority of Iraqis support attacks on insurgent groups with 80% supporting US attacks on Al-Qaeda.

Directly after the invasion, polling suggested that a slight majority supported the US invasion. However polls conducted in June 2005 suggest that there is some sentiment towards Coalition armies being in Iraq. A 2005 poll by British intelligence said that 45% of Iraqis support attacks against Coalition forces, rising to 65% in some areas, and that 82% are "strongly opposed" to the presence of Coalition troops. Demands for U.S. withdrawal have also been signed on by one third of Iraq's Parliament. These results are consistent with a January 2006 poll that found an overall 47% approval for attacks on U.S.-led forces. That figure climbed to 88% among Sunnis. Attacks on Iraqi security forces and civilians, however, were approved of by only 7% and 12% of respondents respectively. Polls conducted between 2005 and 2007 showed 31–37% of Iraqi's wanted US and other Coalition forces to withdraw once security was restored and that 26–35% wanted immediate withdrawal instead.

A September 2006 poll of both Sunnis and Shias found that 71% of Iraqis wanted the U.S. to leave within a year, with 65% favoring an immediate pullout and 77% voicing suspicion that the U.S. wanted to keep permanent bases in Iraq. 61% approved of attacks on U.S. forces. A later poll in March 2007 suggests the percentage of Iraqis who approve of attacks on Coalition forces has dropped to 51%. In 2006 a poll conducted on the Iraqi public revealed that 52% of the ones polled said Iraq was going in the wrong direction and 61% claimed it was worth ousting Saddam Hussein.

Despite a majority having previously been opposed to the US presence, 60% of Iraqis opposed American troops leaving directly prior to withdrawal, with 51% saying withdrawal would have a negative effect.

Scope and size of the Insurgency 

The most intense Sunni insurgent activity takes place in the cities and countryside along the Euphrates River from the Syrian border town of al-Qaim through Ramadi and Fallujah to Baghdad, as well as along the Tigris river from Baghdad north to Tikrit. Heavy guerrilla activity also takes place around the cities of Mosul and Tal Afar in the north, as well as the "Triangle of Death" south of Baghdad, which includes the "-iya" cities of Iskandariya, Mahmudiya, Latifiya, and Yusufiya. Lesser activity takes place in several other areas of the country. The insurgents are believed to maintain a key supply line stretching from Syria through al-Qaim and along the Euphrates to Baghdad and central Iraq, the Iraqi equivalent of the Ho Chi Minh trail. A second "ratline" runs from the Syrian border through Tal Afar to Mosul.

Although estimates of the total number of Iraqi guerrillas varies by group and fluctuates under changing political climate, the latest assessments put the present number at between 3,000 and 7,000 fighters along with numerous supporters and facilitators throughout the Sunni Arab community. At various points U.S. forces provided estimates on the number of fighters in specific regions. A few are provided here (although these numbers almost certainly have fluctuated):
 Fallujah (mid-2004): 2,000–5,000 In a November 2004 operation, the Fallujah insurgency has been destroyed or dispersed, but had staged a comeback in 2005, albeit not to former strength, in the course of 2005–2008 the remainder of the insurgency was defeated in Fallujah and the rest of Al-Anbar province.
 Samarra (August 2011): 1,000+
 Baquba (August 2011 ): 1,000+
 Baghdad (August 2011): 2,000+
Guerilla forces operate in many of the cities and towns of al-Anbar province, due to mostly ineffective Iraqi security forces in this area. There was extensive guerrilla activity in Ramadi, the capital of the province, as well as al-Qa'im, the first stop on an insurgent movement route between Iraq and Syria. In 2006, reports suggested that the Anbar capital Ramadi had largely fallen under insurgent control along with most of the Anbar region, and that as a result the United States had sent an extra 3,500 marines to reestablish control of the region. In the early part of 2007 the insurgency suffered serious setbacks in Ramadi after they were defeated in the Second Battle of Ramadi in the fall of 2006. With the help of the Anbar Salvation Council, incidents fell from an average of 30 attacks per day in December 2006 to an average of fewer than four in April 2007.

Baghdad is still one of the most violent regions of the country, even after the 2007 troop surge more than two-thirds of the violence that takes place in Iraq happens in Baghdad even though the Iraqi Government is in firm control of the entire city. Suicide attacks and car bombs are near daily occurrences in Baghdad. The road from Baghdad to the city airport is the most dangerous in the country, if not the world. Iraqi security and police forces had also been significantly built up in the capital and, despite being constantly targeted, had enjoyed some successes such as the pacification of Haifa Street, which however subsequently saw a massive surge of insurgent activity. and after the failed Coalition Operation Together Forward fell under Sunni insurgent control. The U.S. and Iraqi Forces scored many decisive victories in 2007 during the U.S. troops surge when they launched Operation Law and Order and Operation Phantam Thunder which broke the back of the insurgency and has since the saw a mass reduction in violence by 80 percent since then.

As time passed the insurgent grasp on Mosul has strengthened and by mid-2007 insurgents had control of most neighborhoods on the west bank of the Tigris, with the exception of the few Coalition bases scattered throughout the city and their immediate surroundings. Kurdish peshmerga-forces are in control of the East bank neighborhoods, mostly populated by fellow Kurds.

Recent intelligence suggests that the base of foreign paramilitary operations has moved from Anbar to the religiously and ethnically mixed Diyala province. By July 2007 Diyala had fallen under almost total Insurgent control, and had become the headquarters for the Sunni-dominated Islamic State of Iraq, which has issued a proclamation declaring the regional capital Baqubah its capital.

In response to a law allowing for the partitioning of Iraq into autonomous regions, members of the Mutayibeen Coalition (Khalf al-Mutayibeen), a coalition of Sunni insurgent groups including Al Qaeda in Iraq, announced the creation of the Islamic State of Iraq encompassing parts of 6 of Iraq's 18 provinces on 15 October 2006. Yet another show of defiance came on 18 October when Sunni fighters brazenly paraded in Ramadi. Similar parades were held two days later in several towns across western Iraq, two of which occurred within two miles of U.S. military bases.

By October 2006, small radicalized militias had seemed to overshadow the larger and more organized Sunni groups which had composed the insurgency previously. As disagreements emerged in pre-existing groups for reasons ranging from the rift in the Sunni forces between foreign and Iraqi fighters, competition between Mahdi Army and Badr Brigade, and anger over various decisions such as Muqtada al Sadr's agreement to join the political process, dozens of insurgency groups sprung up across the country, though particularly in Baghdad where the U.S. army has listed 23 active militias. Residents have described the capital as being a patchwork of militia run fiefs. As a result of the insurgency's splintering nature, many established leaders seemed to lose influence. This was particularly illustrated on 19 October, when members of the Mahdi army briefly seized control of Amarah. The attack, while demonstrating the influence of the Madhi army, is believed to have originated as a result of contention between local units of the Madhi army and the allegedly Badr brigade run security forces, and the timing suggested that neither Al Sadr nor his top commanders had known or orchestrated the offensive.

At the height of the war, insurgents launched hundreds of attacks each month against Coalition forces. Overtime, insurgency groups moved to more sophisticated methods of attack such as Explosively formed penetrators, and infrared lasers, which cannot be easily jammed. These attacks contributed to the rate of civilian casualties which in turn reduced Iraq's public safety as well as the reliability of infrastructure.

As of 29 January 2009 4,235 U.S. soldiers, 178 British soldiers and 139 soldiers from other nations (allied with the coalition) have died in Iraq. 31,834 U.S. soldiers had been wounded. Coalition forces do not usually release death counts. As such, the exact number of insurgents killed by the Coalition or Iraqi forces is unknown. Through September 2007 more than 19,000 insurgents were reported to have been killed in fighting with Coalition forces and tens of thousands of Iraqi "suspected civilians" were captured (including 25,000 detainees in U.S. military custody at the time), according to military statistics released for the first time.

Iraqi Coalition counter-insurgency operations 

Over 500 counter-insurgency operations have been undertaken by the U.S.-led Coalition or the Iraqi government. These include Operation Option North and Operation Bayonet Lightning in Kirkuk, Operation Desert Thrust, Operation Abilene and Operation All American Tiger throughout Iraq, Operation Iron Hammer in Baghdad and Operation Ivy Blizzard in Samarra – all in 2003; Operation Market Sweep, Operation Vigilant Resolve and Operation Phantom Fury in Fallujah in 2004; Operation Matador in Anbar, Operation Squeeze Play and Operation Lightning in Baghdad, Operation New Market near Haditha, Operation Spear in Karabillah and the Battle of Tal Afar – all in 2005; Operation Swarmer in Samarra and Operation Together Forward in Baghdad in 2006; and Operation Law and Order in Baghdad, Operation Arrowhead Ripper in Baqouba and Operation Phantom Strike throughout Iraq – all in 2007.

See also 

 Challenge Project
 Sectarian violence in Iraq (2006–2008)
 Iraqi insurgency (2011–2013)
 Consolation payment
 Fallujah during the Iraq War
 Juba (sniper)
 List of revolutions and rebellions
 Iraq War order of battle 2009
 USA kill or capture strategy in Iraq
 USA list of most-wanted Iraqis
 Joint Special Operations Command Task Force in the Iraq War
Chronology:
 History of Iraq (2003–11)
 2003 in Iraq
 2004 in Iraq
 2005 in Iraq
 2006 in Iraq
 2007 in Iraq
 2008 in Iraq
 2008 Mosul offensive
 2009 in Iraq
 2010 in Iraq
 2011 in Iraq

References

Further reading 
 Chehab, Zaki. Iraq Ablaze: Inside the Insurgency, I. B. Tauris & Co Ltd. .
 Who Are the Insurgents? Sunni Arab Rebels in Iraq U.S. Institute of Peace Special Report, April 2005
 Rogers, Paul. Iraq and the War on Terror: Twelve Months of Insurgency. I.B. Tauris. .
 Hashim, Ahmed S. Insurgency and Counter-Insurgency in Iraq. I.B. Tauris. .
 Enders, David. Baghdad Bulletin: Dispatches on the American Occupation University of Michigan Press (4 April 2005) 
 O'Connell, Edward. Bruce R. Pirnie. Counterinsurgency in Iraq: 2003–2006/ RAND .
 Jürgen Todenhöfer Why do you kill? The untold story of the Iraqi resistance.

External links

Analysis 
 Christopher Alexander, Charles Kyle and William McCallister The Iraqi Insurgent Movement, Commonwealth Institute 14 November 2003
 Carl Conetta "400 Days and Out: A Strategy for Solving the Iraq Impasse". Project on Defense Alternatives, 19 July 2005.
 Frontline: The Insurgency PBS Frontline 21 February 2006
 Insurgent Iraq: Links to full-text online articles and reports about the Iraqi Insurgency. Compiled by Project on Defense Alternatives, March 2006. Updated 22 August 2006.
 "Electronic Propaganda in Iraq". wadinet.de (PDF)

News articles 
 Biedermann, Ferry. "Portrait of an Iraqi Rebel." Salon. 16 August 2003, via globalpolicy.
 "Crushing Iraq's insurgency may take up to 10 years." Middle East Online (UK). 23 August 2004.
 multimedia article by Australian Journalist Paul McGeogh of the Sydney Morning Herald

Supportive of the insurgents 
 Iraqi Resistance Reports from albasrah.net.

Profiles of insurgent groups 
 "Iraq's Insurgents: Who's Who". Washington Post, 19 March 2006.
 "Iraqi Insurgent Groups". GlobalSecurity.org, 2005.
 Global Security: Saddam's Martyrs "Men of Sacrifice" Fedayeen Saddam
 BBC: Abu Musab al-Zarqawi
 Global Security: Jaish Ansar al-Sunna

 
2000s in Iraq
2010s in Iraq
Al-Qaeda activities in Iraq
2000s conflicts
2010s conflicts
Civil wars in Iraq
Politics of Iraq
Political neologisms
Islamic terrorism in Iraq
War on Terrorism
Campaigns of the Iraq War
Rebellions in Iraq
Wars involving the Islamic State of Iraq and the Levant
Wars involving Kurdistan Region (Iraq)
Islamic State of Iraq and the Levant in Iraq